Jarosław Mazurkiewicz (born 13 November 1979) is a Polish former footballer who played as a midfielder.

References

1979 births
Living people
Polish footballers
Zawisza Bydgoszcz players
Polonia Warsaw players
Ceramika Opoczno players
R.A.A. Louviéroise players
R.R.C. Peruwelz players
Association football midfielders
Ekstraklasa players
Belgian Pro League players
Polish expatriate footballers
Expatriate footballers in Belgium
Polish expatriate sportspeople in Belgium
Expatriate footballers in Greece
Polish expatriate sportspeople in Greece
Expatriate footballers in Norway
Polish expatriate sportspeople in Norway
Asteras Tripolis F.C. players
A.P.S. Zakynthos players